Bulgarian-Danish relations are foreign relations between Bulgaria and Denmark.  Bulgaria has an embassy in Copenhagen and two honorary consulates (in Hellerup and Silkeborg).  Denmark has an embassy in Sofia.
Both countries are full members of the European Union and NATO.

Royal Visits to Bulgaria 
 Margrethe II of Denmark and Henrik, Prince Consort of Denmark
 17–19 October 2000 - Sofia, Plovdiv and Rila Monastery
 Frederik, Crown Prince of Denmark and Mary, Crown Princess of Denmark
 15–17 September 2008 - Sofia and Plovdiv

See also 
 Foreign relations of Bulgaria
 Foreign relations of Denmark

External links 
   Bulgarian embassy in Copenhagen 
   Danish embassy in Sofia
 Agreement concerning economic, industrial and technical co-operation. Signed at Sofia on 2 September 1967
 Agreement on the development of economic, industrial and technical cooperation. Signed at Copenhagen on 20 May 1994
 Long-Term Agreement on the development of economic, industrial, scientific and technological co-operation (with exchange of letters). Signed at Sofia on 22 April 1975

 

 
Denmark
Bilateral relations of Denmark